The 2018–19 NBA G League season was the 18th season of the NBA G League, the official minor league basketball organization owned by the National Basketball Association (NBA).

League changes
The league expanded by one team, the Capital City Go-Go owned by the Washington Wizards, to have 27 teams for the season.

There were three relocations, with two of them within the team's existing market. The most significant relocation was that of the Reno Bighorns, which were moved by their parent club, the Sacramento Kings, to Stockton, California and renamed the Stockton Kings. One of the in-market relocations was that of the Delaware 87ers, which were moved into a new nearby facility in Wilmington from their former home in Newark, and rebranded as the Delaware Blue Coats. Finally, the Rio Grande Valley Vipers moved within the urban area at the southernmost end of Texas, going from Hidalgo to nearby Edinburg with the opening of Bert Ogden Arena.

With the addition of the Go-Go, the league slightly realigned its six divisions. The Go-Go were added to the Southeast and Delaware was shifted to the Atlantic.

During the season, league president Malcolm Turner stepped down to become the athletics director at Vanderbilt University. He was replaced by Shareef Abdur-Rahim.

Regular season
Final standings:

x – qualified for playoffs; y – Division champion; z – Conference champion

Eastern Conference

Atlantic Division

Central Division

Southeast Division

Western Conference

Midwest Division

Pacific Division

Southwest Division

Playoffs
For the second straight season, the League enacted a six-team playoff, with one-game series for the first three rounds and first round byes for the top two seeds in each conference. For the Finals, a tiebreaker was required since both teams had the same record, for which there existed three tiebreakers: best winning percentage against each other, record against the other conference, or random drawing, which resulted in the Long Island Nets hosting the first and last game of the Finals against the Rio Grande Valley Vipers. The Nets won Game 1 117-107, but the Vipers won Game 2 127-116 and then won the series in Game 3 129-112 to win their third league title, most for any team in history.

Finals boxscore

Statistics

Individual statistic leaders

Individual game highs

Team statistic leaders

References

External links
Official website
2018-19 NBA G-League season at Basketball Reference